Lou Yaping (born 13 March 1971) is a Chinese former freestyle swimmer who competed in the 1988 Summer Olympics.

References

1971 births
Living people
Chinese female freestyle swimmers
Olympic swimmers of China
Swimmers at the 1988 Summer Olympics
20th-century Chinese women